"Rock Me" is a song recorded in 1974 by Swedish pop group ABBA, with Björn Ulvaeus singing the lead vocals. It was first released on their third album, ABBA, and was used as the B-side to the group's 1975 single "I Do, I Do, I Do, I Do, I Do". However, after "I Do, I Do, I Do, I Do, I Do" hit number one in both Australia and New Zealand, "Rock Me" was released as an A-side in April 1976, reaching number four and number two respectively. It was also issued as an A-side in Yugoslavia and in 1979 it was included on the band's Greatest Hits Vol. 2 album.

ABBA performed the track on both their world tours, as seen in ABBA: The Movie (1977). The song was originally to be featured in the ABBA musical "Mamma Mia!", to be sung on a boat, as the three fathers and a deleted character (Stanley) rocked the boat from side to side.

History
"Rock Me", whose working title had been "Didn't I?", was first recorded as "Baby" (with different lyrics to the final version) on 18 October 1974 at Glen Studio. This "tongue in cheek" version, with vocals courtesy of Agnetha, was first released on CD on the 1994 box set Thank You for the Music as part of the "ABBA Undeleted" section.

Charts

Weekly charts

Year-end charts

Cover versions
Brendon recorded a version in 1977 as a follow-up to his hit "Gimme Some".
German eurodance group E-Rotic covered the song for their 1997 ABBA tribute album Thank You for the Music.
Australian rock band Audioscam covered the song on their 2008 album Abbattack. Samples from the album can be heard on their official MySpace page.
Studio 99 recorded a version for their Studio Perform a Tribute to ABBA, Vol. 2 album.

References

External links
 ABBA For the Record

1974 songs
1976 singles
ABBA songs
Polar Music singles
Songs written by Benny Andersson and Björn Ulvaeus